The Holy Island Group is a sequence of metasedimentary rocks of Cambro-Ordovician (Furongian to Tremadocian) age found in northern and western Anglesey and the adjacent Holy Island in North Wales. It comprises four formations; a lower South Stack Formation, an overlying Holyhead Formation, a succeeding Rhoscolyn Formation and an uppermost New Harbour Formation. The South Stack Formation outcrops on Holy Island, between Holyhead and South Stack and at Rhoscolyn, and also inland on Anglesey itself between Mynydd Mechell and Carreglefn. The Holyhead and Rhoscolyn formations are restricted to the Holyhead Mountain and Rhoscolyn areas of Holy Island. The New Harbour Formation, which previously enjoyed 'Group' status, is some 2km thick and conformably overlies the Rhoscolyn Formation. It extends across much of northern and western Anglesey and Holy Island.

References

Further reading 

Campbell,S., Wood,M. and Windley,B. (2014) Footsteps through Time: the rocks and landscape of Anglesey explained. GeoMôn, Isle of Anglesey County Council

Geologic formations of Wales
Cambrian System of Europe
Ordovician System of Europe
Cambrian Wales
Ordovician Wales
Furongian